Scott Marshall Smith (died December 3, 2020) was an American screenwriter.

References

2020 deaths
American male screenwriters
Tisch School of the Arts alumni
20th-century American screenwriters
21st-century American screenwriters
20th-century American male writers
21st-century American male writers